Risankizumab, sold under the brand name Skyrizi, is a humanized monoclonal antibody targeting interleukin 23A (IL-23A). Risankizumab is part of a collaboration between Boehringer Ingelheim and AbbVie. Risankizumab has been approved in the European Union, the United States, and Canada for the treatment of moderate to severe plaque psoriasis in adults who are candidates for systemic therapy, and moderate to severe Crohn's disease in the United States. In Japan, it is approved for treating plaque psoriasis, generalized pustular psoriasis, erythrodermic psoriasis and psoriatic arthritis in adults who have an inadequate response to conventional therapies.

Clinical trials

Psoriasis 
In a phase I clinical trial, thirty-nine patients received single-dose risankizumab, eighteen of which received the drug intravenously, thirteen subcutaneously, and eight received the placebo drug. There were several instances that adverse effects occurred but in the same frequency for the placebo and the experimental groups. Four serious adverse events occurred in the risankizumab treated patients, all of which were judged not treatment related. Risankizumab was associated with clinical improvement in individuals treated with the drug, from week 2 and maintained for up to 66 weeks after treatment. At week 12 of treatment, 75%, 90%, and 100% decreases in the Psoriasis Area and Severity Index (PASI) were achieved by 87%, 58%, and 16% of risankizumab treated patients, regardless of dose, respectively, versus individuals receiving placebo. Significant correlation between treatment-associated molecular changes and PASI improvement was observed in the risankizumab treated patients.

The efficacy, safety and tolerability was further investigated in a phase III program comprising four clinical trials which compared risankizumab to ustekinumab, adalimumab and placebo in the indication of plaque psoriasis. The results of these trials confirmed the efficacy and tolerability of risankizumab.

History
Risankizumab was approved by the U.S. Food and Drug Administration (FDA) for treatment of moderate-to-severe plaque psoriasis in April 2019.

The FDA approved risankizumab based on evidence primarily from five clinical trials (Trial 1/NCT0202684370, Trial 2/NCT02684357, Trial 3/NCT02672852, Trial 4/ NCT02694523 and Trial 5/NCT02054481) of 1606 patients with moderate to severe plaque psoriasis. The trials were conducted in Asia, Canada, Europe, Mexico, South America, and the United States.

References

External links 
 

Antipsoriatics
Immunosuppressants
Monoclonal antibodies
AbbVie brands